A kit lens is a "starter" lens which can be sold with an interchangeable-lens camera such as a single-lens reflex camera. It is generally an inexpensive lens priced at the lowest end of the manufacturer's range so as to not add much to a camera kit's price. The kit consists of the camera body, the lens, and various accessories usually necessary to get started in SLR photography. A kit lens can be sold by itself outside of a kit, particularly the ones that are moderately expensive; for instance a kit lens included in a prosumer SLR kit is often marketed as an upgrade lens for a consumer SLR. In addition, retailers often have promotions of standalone low-end SLR bodies without the lens, or a package that bundles the SLR body with one or two more expensive lenses.

Originally kit lenses were of normal focal length; more recently kit lenses tend to be inexpensive zoom lenses that range from medium wide angle to mid telephoto for added versatility.  Prime lenses are generally faster (smaller f-number) than comparably priced zoom lenses, so the change to zoom lenses means that recent kit lenses are usually also slower (higher f-number). However, in most cases the inclusion of an inexpensive zoom lens is to maintain a low entry price and maximize usability for the beginner photographer. More expensive camera bodies are often paired with a likewise more expensive, thus possibly faster, lens.

Originally high end SLRs were always sold body-only without a lens as most buyers were experienced users who already had lenses. Today however this is not always the case and even high end SLRs can be purchased with a lens, albeit an appropriately higher-quality lens. In these cases the typically uncomplimentary term "kit lens' is somewhat of a misnomer. Sometimes the lens is added by the retailer at a reduced price over separate body+lens pricing.

Analog single-lens reflex cameras

Olympus
Zuiko 50mm f/1.8 for all manual focus Olympus OMs
Zuiko 50mm f/2.0 PF for Olympus OM-101

Digital single-lens reflex cameras
Because of the crop factor, kit lenses for APS-C format cameras (like Canon EF-S and Nikon DX) have shorter focal lengths, to get the same field of view.

Canon
 Canon EF-S 18–55mm lens: common on consumer-level cameras series (known as Rebel in North America and Kiss in Japan), such as 400D
 Canon EF-S 18–55mm IS lens: Replaced the original 18–55mm on all consumer-level cameras starting from the 450D. It was replaced by an updated version starting with the 600D and 1100D.
 Canon EF-S 18–55mm IS STM lens: Replaced the first 18–55mm IS on all consumer-level cameras starting with the 700D and 100D. A revised version became the standard consumer-level kit lens with the introduction of the 77D and 800D.
 Canon EF-S 17–85mm lens: Canon EOS 20D, Canon EOS 30D, 40D, 50D, optional on 400D
 Canon EF 24–105mm lens: 5D, 5D Mark II, 5D Mark III, Canon 6D
 Canon EF 28–135mm lens: 50D, optional on 7D
 Canon EF 28–105mm lens: Alternative lens
 Canon EF 28–80mm lens: Kit lens for film-body Canon Elan series. The original version of this lens (with metal mount and full-time manual focus) is considered a vastly superior lens to later versions, however both were included as kit lenses.
 Canon EF-S 15–85mm lens: Canon EOS 60D, 7D
 Canon EF-S 18–135mm lens: 550D, 60D, 70D, 7D; optional on 600D
 Canon EF-S 18–135 IS USM lens: Optional on 7D Mark II, 80D, 77D, and 800D.
 Canon EF-S 18–200mm lens: 50D, optional on 60D

Canon have also marketed twin lens kits, typically with the non IS version of the Canon EF-S 18-55mm lenses and

 Canon EF 55-200mm lens: A now discontinued lens supplied with earlier cameras such as the 350D.
 Canon EF 75-300mm lens: Supplied with later cameras such as the 500D.

Nikon

SLRs and DSLRs
 AF-S DX Nikkor 18-105mm f/3.5-5.6G SWM IF-ED VR (as of August 2008, Nikon D90)
 AF-S DX Nikkor 18-135mm f/3.5-5.6G SWM IF-ED (as of September 2006, Nikon D80)
 Nikon AF-S DX Nikkor 18-140mm f/3.5-5.6G ED VR (with Nikon D5300, D5500)
 Nikkor 18-55mm DX f/3.5-5.6G, various versions:
 AF-S DX Nikkor 18-55mm f/3.5-5.6G (as of April 2005, Nikon D50)
 AF-S DX Nikkor 18-55mm f/3.5-5.6G II (as of November 2006, Nikon D40 and D40x)
 AF-S DX Nikkor 18-55mm f/3.5-5.6G VR (as of November 2007, low end entry level DSLRs)
 AF-S DX Nikkor 18-55mm f/3.5-5.6G VR II (as of January, 2014, low end entry-level DSLRs)
 AF-P DX Nikkor 18-55mm f/3.5-5.6G VR (as of January, 2014, low end entry-level DSLRs)
 Nikon Nikkor AF-S 55-200mm f/4-5.6 ED VR (with Nikon D5000, D3100)
 Nikon AF-S Nikkor 16-80mm f/2.8-4E ED VR (with Nikon D500)
 Nikon AF-S Nikkor 24-85mm f/3.5-4.5G ED AF-S VR (with Nikon D600)
 Nikon AF-S Nikkor 24-120mm f/4G ED VR (with Nikon D750, D780)
 Nikon AF-S Nikkor 70-300mm f/4.5-5.6G VR (with Nikon D610) 
 Nikon AF-S 18-70mm f/3.5-4.5G ED-IF DX Zoom-Nikkor (Nikon D70)
 AF Nikkor 28-80mm f/3.3-5.6G (late 90s film SLRs and early 2000s, such as the Nikon F75 and Nikon N80) 
Nikon 50mm F1.8 Series E (older 70s and 80s film cameras, such as the Nikon EM)
Nikon 50mm F1.8G SE (with Nikon Df body)
Nikon 35-70mm f/3.3-4.5 AF (early AF cameras such as the N4004)

MILCs
Nikon offers three kit lenses with its 1 series cameras. One lens is included in all Nikon 1 kits: 
 Nikon 1 Nikkor 10–30mm 3.5-5.6 VR

Nikon also sells so-called "twin kits" or "double kits" with the Nikon 1. These combine a second lens with the 10–30mm:
 Nikon 1 Nikkor 10mm 2.8 — Part of the "Wide Angle Kit"; a pancake lens.
 Nikon 1 Nikkor 30–110mm 3.8-5.6 VR — Part of the "Zoom Kit".

Micro Four Thirds MILCs
Panasonic offers three kit lenses with its Micro Four Thirds cameras. 
 Lumix® G X VARIO PZ 14-42mm / 3.5-5.6 ASPH. / POWER O.I.S.
 Lumix® G VARIO HD 14-140mm / 4.0-5.8 ASPH. / MEGA O.I.S.
 Lumix® G 14mm / 2.5 ASPH

Pentax
 SMC DA 18-55mm f/3.5-5.6 AL: bundled with Pentax K10D, K100D, K110D, and K100D Super.
 SMC DA 18-55mm f/3.5-5.6 AL II: updated version, bundled with K20D and K200D.
 SMC DA L 18-55mm f/3.5-5.6 AL: plastic mount version, bundled with K-x and K-r.
 SMC DA 18-55mm f/3.5-5.6 AL WR: weather-resistant version, bundled with K-7, K-5.
 SMC DA L 18-50mm F4-5.6 DC WR RE; plastic mount version of HD Pentax-DA 18-50mm F4-5.6 DC WR RE, bundled with K-S2
 SMC DA 18-135mm f/3.5-5.6 ED AL DC WR: weather-resistant version, bundled with K-5 and K-30 and K-r.
 SMC DA 40mm f/2.8 XS: pancake, bundled with K-01.
 SMC DA L 50-200mm f/4.0-5.6 ED: plastic mount version, bundled with K-r and K-x.
 SMC DA 50-200mm f/4.0-5.6 ED WR: weather-resistant version, bundled with K-5 and K-30.

Sony
 Sony DT 18-70mm f/3.5-5.6: bundled with Sony α 100, Sony α 200.Sony α 300, Sony α 350.
 Sony DT 18-55mm f/3.5-5.6 SAM, bundled with Sony A230, A330, A380, A33, A35, A55, A65.
 Sony DT 16-105 f/3.5-5.6: A700
 Sony DT 16–50 2.8: A77

Four Thirds
 Zuiko Digital 14-42mm f/3.5-5.6 (a.k.a. short kit).
 Zuiko Digital 40-150mm f/4.0-5.6 (a.k.a. long kit).

Olympus bundles camera with short kit lens alone or with both kit lenses, the latter bundle is known as doublekit.

Mirrorless system cameras

Fujifilm
Does not make kit lenses by the definition as being substandard, entry level and inferior to their range. They do bundle lenses with bodies at a discount.

References

Photographic lenses